Kentucky Route 1954 (KY 1954) is a north–south secondary highway located entirely in McCracken County in western Kentucky.

Intersections

References

External links
Kentucky Transportation Cabinet

1954
1954